Mesua nivenii is a species of flowering plant in the family Calophyllaceae. It is a tree endemic to Peninsular Malaysia.

References

nivenii
Endemic flora of Peninsular Malaysia
Trees of Peninsular Malaysia
Least concern plants
Taxonomy articles created by Polbot